Santiago Arzamendia Duarte (born 5 May 1998) is professional footballer who plays as a left-back for La Liga club Cádiz. Born in Argentina, he represents the Paraguay national team.

Club career
Born to Paraguayan parents in Wanda, in the Argentine province of Misiones, Arzamendia moved to Paraguay at age 13 and joined Cerro Porteño after passing the try outs. He made his debut as a senior for them during the 2015 campaign.

On 8 July 2021, Arzamendia signed a four-year contract with La Liga side Cádiz CF.

International career
Eligible to play for Argentina or Paraguay, Arzamendia chose the latter in late September 2018. He made his debut for the Paraguay on 26 March 2019 in a friendly against Mexico, as a starter.

Career statistics

Club

International

References

External links

1998 births
Living people
Sportspeople from Misiones Province
Argentine sportspeople of Paraguayan descent
Citizens of Paraguay through descent
Argentine footballers
Paraguayan footballers
Paraguay international footballers
Association football defenders
Paraguayan Primera División players
La Liga players
Cerro Porteño players
Cádiz CF players
2019 Copa América players
2021 Copa América players
Paraguayan expatriate footballers
Paraguayan expatriate sportspeople in Spain
Expatriate footballers in Spain